Maryland Route 624 (MD 624) is a state highway in the U.S. state of Maryland.  The state highway runs  from MD 165 in Pylesville north to State Route 2080 (SR 2080) at the Pennsylvania state line a short distance north of its intersection with MD 136 at Graceton.  MD 624 was constructed in the mid-1930s.

Route description

MD 624 begins at an intersection with MD 165 (Pylesville Road) in Pylesville.  Grier Nursery Road heads south from the intersection as a county highway toward the village of Street.  The state highway heads north as two-lane undivided Graceton Road through residences on large lots and farmland and crosses Broad Creek.  After intersecting MD 136 (Whiteford Road) in the hamlet of Graceton, MD 624 curves to the west to meet its northern terminus on a tangent with the Pennsylvania state line.  Graceton Road continues west on top of the state line as SR 2080 to an intersection with PA 851 near Fawn Grove.

History
MD 624 was constructed in 1936.  The state highway has not changed since except for minor improvements.

Junction list

See also

References

External links

MDRoads: MD 624

624
Maryland Route 624